The 2008 women's road cycling season was the fourth season for the 2008 UCI Women's Cycling Team Team Flexpoint (UCI code: FLX), which began as Buitenpoort-Flexpoint Team in 2005.

Roster

  Elisabeth Braam
  Saskia Elemans
  Loes Gunnewijk
  Britt Jochems
  Jacobien Kanis
  Bianca Knöpfle
  Susanne Ljungskog
  Loes Markerink
  Mirjam Melchers
  Amber Neben
  Trine Schmidt
  Iris Slappendel
  Adriene Snijder
  Anita Valen
  Suzanne van Veen
  Elise van Hage
Source:

Results

Season victories

Results in major races

Other achievements

Dutch national records, team pursuit 

The women's 3000 m team pursuit track cycling discipline was introduced at the 2007–08 track cycling season. Elise van Hage was once part of the team when they broke the Dutch national record. This is not the current record anymore.

UCI World Ranking

The team finished 19th in the UCI ranking for teams.

References

2008 UCI Women's Teams seasons
2008 in Dutch sport
Team Flexpoint